Avengers: Endgame is a 2019 American superhero film based on the Marvel Comics superhero team the Avengers. Produced by Marvel Studios and distributed by Walt Disney Studios Motion Pictures, it is the direct sequel to Avengers: Infinity War (2018) and the 22nd film in the Marvel Cinematic Universe (MCU). Directed by Anthony and Joe Russo and written by Christopher Markus and Stephen McFeely, the film features an ensemble cast including Robert Downey Jr., Chris Evans, Mark Ruffalo, Chris Hemsworth, Scarlett Johansson, Jeremy Renner, Don Cheadle, Paul Rudd, Brie Larson, Karen Gillan, Danai Gurira, Benedict Wong, Jon Favreau, Bradley Cooper, Gwyneth Paltrow, and Josh Brolin. In the film, the surviving members of the Avengers and their allies attempt to reverse Thanos's actions in Infinity War.

The film was announced in October 2014 as Avengers: Infinity War – Part 2, but Marvel later removed this title. The Russo brothers joined as directors in April 2015, with Markus and McFeely signing on to write the script a month later. The film serves as a conclusion to the story of the MCU up to that point, ending the story arcs for several main characters. The plot revisits several moments from earlier films, bringing back actors and settings from throughout the franchise. Filming began in August 2017 at Pinewood Atlanta Studios in Fayette County, Georgia, shooting back-to-back with Infinity War, and ended in January 2018. Additional filming took place in the Metro and Downtown Atlanta areas, the state of New York, Scotland, and England. The official title was revealed in December 2018. With an estimated budget of $356–400million, the film is one of the most expensive films ever made.

Avengers: Endgame premiered in Los Angeles on April 22, 2019, and was released in the United States on April 26, as part of Phase Three of the MCU. The film received praise for its direction, acting, musical score, action sequences, visual effects, and emotional weight, with critics lauding its culmination of the 22-film story. The film grossed $2.798 billion worldwide, surpassing Infinity War entire theatrical run in just eleven days and breaking numerous box office records, including becoming the highest-grossing film of all time from July 2019 until March 2021. It received a nomination for Best Visual Effects at the 92nd Academy Awards, among numerous other accolades. Fifth and sixth Avengers films, titled Avengers: The Kang Dynasty and Avengers: Secret Wars, respectively, are scheduled to be released in 2025 and 2026.

Plot 

In 2018, twenty-three days after Thanos erased half of all life in the universe, Carol Danvers rescues Tony Stark and Nebula from deep space and they reunite with the remaining Avengers—Bruce Banner, Steve Rogers, Thor, Natasha Romanoff, and James Rhodes—and Rocket on Earth. Locating Thanos on an uninhabited planet, they plan to use the Infinity Stones to reverse his actions, but discover Thanos has already destroyed them to prevent further use. Enraged, Thor decapitates Thanos.

Five years later, Scott Lang escapes from the Quantum Realm. Reaching the Avengers Compound, he explains that he experienced only five hours while trapped. Theorizing that the Quantum Realm allows time travel, they ask a reluctant Stark to help them retrieve the Stones from the past to reverse the actions of Thanos in the present. Stark, Rocket, and Banner, who has since merged his intelligence with the Hulk's strength, build a time machine. Banner notes that altering the past does not affect their present; any changes create alternate realities. Banner and Rocket travel to Norway, where they visit the Asgardian refugees' settlement New Asgard and recruit an overweight and despondent Thor. In Tokyo, Romanoff recruits Clint Barton, who became a vigilante after the death of his family.

Banner, Lang, Rogers, and Stark time-travel to New York City during Loki's attack in 2012. At the Sanctum Sanctorum, Banner convinces the Ancient One to give him the Time Stone after promising to return the various Stones to their proper points in time. At Stark Tower, Rogers retrieves the Mind Stone from Hydra sleeper agents, but Stark and Lang's attempt to steal the Space Stone fails, allowing 2012-Loki to escape with it. Rogers and Stark travel to Camp Lehigh in 1970, where Stark obtains an earlier version of the Space Stone and encounters his father, Howard. Rogers steals Pym Particles from Hank Pym to return to the present and spies his lost love, Peggy Carter.

Meanwhile, Rocket and Thor travel to Asgard in 2013; Rocket extracts the Reality Stone from Jane Foster, while Thor gets encouragement from his mother, Frigga, and retrieves his old hammer, Mjolnir. Barton, Romanoff, Nebula, and Rhodes travel to 2014; Nebula and Rhodes go to Morag and steal the Power Stone before Peter Quill can, while Barton and Romanoff travel to Vormir. The Soul Stone's keeper, Red Skull, reveals it can only be acquired by sacrificing a loved one. Romanoff sacrifices herself, allowing Barton to get the Stone. Rhodes and Nebula attempt to return to their own time, but Nebula is incapacitated when her cybernetic implants link with her past self, allowing 2014-Thanos to learn of his future self's success and the Avengers' attempt to undo it. 2014-Thanos sends 2014-Nebula forward in time to prepare for his arrival.

Reuniting in the present, the Avengers place the Stones into a gauntlet that Stark, Banner, and Rocket have built. Having the most resistance to their radiation, Banner wields the gauntlet and reverses Thanos's disintegrations. Meanwhile, 2014-Nebula, impersonating her future self, uses the time machine to transport 2014-Thanos and his warship to the present, which he then uses to destroy the Avengers Compound. Present-day Nebula convinces 2014-Gamora to betray Thanos, but is unable to convince 2014-Nebula and kills her. Thanos overpowers Stark, Thor, and a Mjolnir-wielding Rogers and summons his army to retrieve the Stones, intent on using them to destroy the universe and create a new one. A restored Stephen Strange arrives with other sorcerers, the restored Avengers and Guardians of the Galaxy, the Ravagers, and the armies of Wakanda and Asgard to fight Thanos's army. Danvers also arrives and destroys Thanos's warship, but Thanos overpowers her and seizes the gauntlet. Stark steals the Stones and uses them to disintegrate Thanos and his army, at the cost of his life.

Following Stark's funeral, Thor appoints Valkyrie as the new king of New Asgard and joins the Guardians. Rogers returns the Stones and Mjolnir to their proper timelines and remains to live with Carter in the past. In the present, an elderly Rogers passes his shield to Sam Wilson.

Cast 

 Robert Downey Jr. as Tony Stark / Iron Man: The benefactor of the Avengers who describes himself as a "genius, billionaire, playboy, and philanthropist" with electromechanical suits of armor of his own making. According to directors Joe and Anthony Russo, Downey was the only actor to receive the entire screenplay for the film. Screenwriters Christopher Markus and Stephen McFeely knew that Stark's death was inevitable both as a "[move] to selflessness" and as an end to the "chapter" Stark started. They felt that his death was earned after granting him "the perfect retirement life," adding, "That's the life he's been striving for [...] They got married, they had a kid, it was great. It's a good death. It doesn't feel like a tragedy. It feels like a heroic, finished life." Joe Russo explained that Stark "always knew he was going to die because he could never reconcile that notion in himself of not protecting the universe," and added that Stark was the most defiant among the Avengers since "Stark is the most formidable of all of them [...] because of his heart." The Russos sought Downey's approval for Stark's arc, which they had developed since Captain America: Civil War (2016).
 Chris Evans as Steve Rogers / Captain America:The leader of the Avengers, World War II veteran and former fugitive, he was enhanced to the peak of human physicality by an experimental serum and frozen in suspended animation before waking up in the modern world. Markus described Rogers as someone who is "moving toward some sort of enlightened self-interest". McFeely knew Rogers "was going to get his dance" he promised Peggy Carter in Captain America: The First Avenger (2011), with McFeely said that Rogers "postponed a life" to "fulfill his duty", and McFeely "didn't think we were ever going to kill him", which is "not the [Rogers story] arc". Instead, Rogers's arc was to "finally get to put [his] shield down". Patrick Gorman provided on-set reference for an elderly Steve Rogers.
 Mark Ruffalo as Bruce Banner / Hulk:  An Avenger and genius scientist who, because of exposure to gamma radiation, typically transforms into a monster when enraged or agitated. In this film, Banner has managed to balance his two sides with gamma experimentation, enabling him to combine his intelligence with the Hulk's strength and physical stature, based on the "Professor Hulk" comic book identity. Compared to other heroes, who were demotivated by their loss against Thanos, Banner is the only character to remain hopeful, with Anthony Russo explaining, "Banner is the sole character who is actually forging into a bright new future, trying to build something totally new and find something completely new [...] Banner is the one who is most heroic in a sense that he maintains his will to keep trying." This concludes a character arc that was established in Thor: Ragnarok (2017) and continued in Avengers: Infinity War.
 Chris Hemsworth as Thor:  An Avenger and the king of Asgard, based on the Norse mythological deity of the same name. Thor now wields a mystical axe known as Stormbreaker, after the destruction of his hammer, Mjolnir, in Thor: Ragnarok. In the film, Thor has become an overweight, drunken ruler of Asgard's refugees in Tønsberg, Norway. Referencing this drastic character change, Hemsworth said, "I just had an opinion. I wanted to do something different this time. Each film I've wanted to, in particular, the last couple, and they were on board," and added, "We shot for many hours and days and discussed how far could we push (Thor) and what we could do different." Anthony Russo added, "Even though there's a lot of fun to be had in the movie with his physical condition, it's not a gag. It's a manifestation of where he is on a character level, and we think it's one of the most relatable aspects of him. I mean, it's a very common sort of response to depression and pain." Thor's story was his favorite arc, saying: "Part of Chris' magic as a comedic actor is his dedication to the depth of the character on a very earnest level [...] It's so devious and subversive when comedy is coming from a place of complete commitment and emotional complexity." Hemsworth underwent around three hours of hair and makeup for the transformation, which also required him to wear a large silicone prosthetic suit; he called himself "Lebowski Thor" on set. Initially, Thor was supposed to revert to his "old chiseled self" in the middle of Endgame, but Hemsworth successfully argued in favor of retaining Thor's new physique.
 Scarlett Johansson as Natasha Romanoff / Black Widow:  An Avenger and a highly trained spy and former agent of S.H.I.E.L.D. At the beginning of the film, Romanoff continues to command several teams from around the galaxy in the Avengers headquarters, which Joe Russo explained stemmed from her inability to move on from their failure to stop Thanos, saying, "she's doing everything she can to try and hold the community together [...] She's the watcher on the wall still." On the decision for Romanoff to sacrifice herself for Barton to acquire the Soul Stone to bring back everyone, Joe Russo stated that it was part of a larger theme exploring the desire to sacrifice, compared to the desire to protect in Infinity War; he says, "When she gets to that [Soul Stone] scene, I think she understands that the only way to bring the community back is for her to sacrifice herself." McFeely stated, "Her journey, in our minds, had come to an end if she could get the Avengers back. She comes from such an abusive, terrible, mind-control background, so when she gets to Vormir and she has a chance to get the family back, that's a thing she would trade for." To prepare for the film, Johansson underwent a high-intensity workout regimen, which included plyometrics, Olympic weightlifting, and gymnastics, as well as a time-restricted eating diet, all under the supervision of her longtime trainer, Eric Johnson, with whom she had worked since Iron Man 2 (2010), the film which introduced her character.
 Jeremy Renner as Clint Barton / Hawkeye:  A master archer and a former Avenger and agent of S.H.I.E.L.D. who recently served on house arrest. McFeely described Barton's dark turn as "a good example of people who had much stronger stories after the Snap." The film's cold open, which features the disintegration of Barton's family, was initially supposed to be in Infinity War following Thanos's snap; however, it was moved to Endgame instead, with Markus explaining that it was "going to blunt the brutality of what [Thanos] did." Joe Russo felt it was "a very tragic scene to open the movie with. It's one of the few scenes in the movie that actually makes me tear up when I watch it, because I think about my own family [...] And then you think about what would happen to you, as a father. You'd become very self-destructive."
 Don Cheadle as James "Rhodey" Rhodes / War Machine: An officer in the U.S. Air Force and Avenger who operates the War Machine armor. Cheadle described Rhodes's newfound belonging as an Avenger as "not so much straddling one foot in the military. He's much more on the side of The Avengers than he was prior." This is reflected on Rhodes's more instinctive and realist worldview in the midst of encountering the fantastic, with Cheadle explaining, "He's definitely got some 'what-the-eff-is-happening' [attitude,] more than maybe the rest of them do, given his background. But it's a trial by fire, and he's quickly adapted to what [the threat] is, rather than what he wishes it were."
 Paul Rudd as Scott Lang / Ant-Man:  A former petty criminal and Avenger who acquired a suit that allows him to shrink or grow in scale while also increasing in strength. Lang is portrayed by twins Bazlo and Loen LeClair as a baby, by Jackson A. Dunn at age 12, and by Lee Moore at age 93. This was Moore's final film before his death in August 2018. Markus explained that adding Lang helped with implementing time travel into the film, saying, "we had access to him in the second movie, and the fact that he was bringing a whole subset of technology that did have something to do with a different concept of time was like a birthday present."
 Brie Larson as Carol Danvers / Captain Marvel:  An ex-U.S. Air Force fighter pilot and Avenger whose DNA was altered during an accident, imbuing her with superhuman strength, energy projection, and flight. Markus stated that Danvers's powers are on a scale that has not previously existed in the MCU and likened her personality to Rogers's, "which is sort of a person who's right and knows they're right and doesn't really want to hear it when you tell them they're wrong". Danvers has little screen time in the film, which McFeely reasoned as "not the story we're trying to tell—it's the original Avengers dealing with loss and coming to a conclusion, and she's the new, fresh blood." Larson filmed her scenes for Endgame before beginning work on her solo film Captain Marvel (2019), which was released first. Captain Marvel directors Anna Boden and Ryan Fleck were present for the filming of her scenes in Endgame and gave Danvers's characterization in the film their blessing.
 Karen Gillan as Nebula:  An adopted daughter of Thanos and Avenger who was raised with Gamora as siblings. After being previously featured as an antagonist or an anti-hero in previous MCU films, Nebula undergoes a redemption arc in the film where she makes amends for her past actions, including an encounter with a past version of herself, with Gillan adding that she is "staring her former self in the face and it's really clear how far she's come from that angry, bitter and twisted person. She's starting to connect with other people and find some level of forgiveness." Gillan guessed that Nebula would play a prominent role in the film when she realized that Infinity War and Endgame would be adapted from The Infinity Gauntlet, which she had previously read when she was initially cast as Nebula in Guardians of the Galaxy (2014). Gillan shared several scenes with Downey in the film's opening, and the two improvised most of their scenes together.
 Danai Gurira as Okoye: The general of the Dora Milaje, a group of elite women warriors.
 Benedict Wong as Wong: A Master of the Mystic Arts and a companion of Doctor Strange.
 Jon Favreau as Happy Hogan: The former head of security at Stark Industries and Stark's friend and former driver.
 Bradley Cooper as Rocket:  A member of the Guardians and Avenger who is a genetically engineered raccoon-based bounty hunter, mercenary, and master of weapons and battle tactics. Sean Gunn was again the stand-in for Rocket during filming, with his acting and expressions serving as motion reference for the character. Rocket's appearance in the film continues a story arc that was established by Guardians of the Galaxy writer-director and Endgame executive producer James Gunn in the first two Guardians of the Galaxy films, was continued in Infinity War and Endgame, and will conclude in Guardians of the Galaxy Vol. 3 (2023).
 Gwyneth Paltrow as Pepper Potts: Stark's wife and the CEO of Stark Industries. Potts wears a weaponized powered exosuit of armor made for her by Stark, based on the Rescue armor. Paltrow said this would be her final major appearance in the MCU.
 Josh Brolin as Thanos:  An intergalactic warlord from Titan who, in Infinity War, acquired all six Infinity Stones and triggered the Snap, killing half of all life in the universe. Joe Russo said that after Thanos was successful in Avengers: Infinity War, he is now "done. He did it. He's retired." Markus and McFeely had difficulty in factoring the older, post-Infinity War, Thanos into the film due to the character already possessing the Infinity Stones, until executive producer Trinh Tran suggested that they kill Thanos in the film's first act. Markus explained that the character's early death "reinforced Thanos' agenda. He was done [...] it was like, 'If I've got to die, I can die now.'" Thanos has less screen time in Endgame than in Infinity War, where he was considered the main character, as explained by McFeely: "We had to give ourselves permission to backseat the villain a little bit. I don't think anyone in the first half of the movie is going, 'Oh I wish there was a villain'. You're rolling around in the loss and the time heist, and you think it's sort of Avengers against nature." The younger version of Thanos was nicknamed "Warrior Thanos" by the filmmakers. In addition to providing the voice for the character, Brolin performed motion capture on set. Joe Russo was a stand-in for Thanos for some scenes opposite Nebula.

Several actors from Infinity War reprise their roles in Endgame, including Benedict Cumberbatch as Dr. Stephen Strange, Chadwick Boseman as T'Challa / Black Panther, Tom Holland as Peter Parker / Spider-Man, Zoe Saldaña as Gamora, Elizabeth Olsen as Wanda Maximoff, Anthony Mackie as Sam Wilson / Falcon, Sebastian Stan as Bucky Barnes / Winter Soldier, Tom Hiddleston as Loki, Pom Klementieff as Mantis, Dave Bautista as Drax the Destroyer, Letitia Wright as Shuri, William Hurt as Thaddeus Ross, Cobie Smulders as Maria Hill, Winston Duke as M'Baku, Tom Vaughan-Lawlor as Ebony Maw, Jacob Batalon as Ned, Vin Diesel as Groot, Chris Pratt as Peter Quill / Star-Lord, Samuel L. Jackson as Nick Fury, Ross Marquand as Red Skull / Stonekeeper, Michael James Shaw as Corvus Glaive, Terry Notary as Cull Obsidian, and Kerry Condon as the voice of Stark's suit AI F.R.I.D.A.Y. Monique Ganderton again provides motion capture for Proxima Midnight.

Also reprising their roles from previous MCU films are Evangeline Lilly as Hope van Dyne / Wasp, Tessa Thompson as Valkyrie, Rene Russo as Frigga, John Slattery as Howard Stark, Tilda Swinton as the Ancient One, Hayley Atwell as Peggy Carter, Marisa Tomei as May Parker, Taika Waititi as Korg, Angela Bassett as Ramonda, Michael Douglas as Hank Pym, Michelle Pfeiffer as Janet van Dyne, Linda Cardellini as Laura Barton, Maximiliano Hernández as Jasper Sitwell, Frank Grillo as Brock Rumlow, Robert Redford as Alexander Pierce, Callan Mulvey as Jack Rollins, and Ty Simpkins as Harley Keener. Sean Gunn reprised his role as Kraglin and was credited for the role, though footage of his appearance is not clearly visible in the film. Natalie Portman appears as Jane Foster through the use of footage from a Thor: The Dark World (2013) deleted scene, as well as new voice over that Portman recorded for when Foster appears talking in the distance. James D'Arcy reprises his role as Edwin Jarvis from the MCU television series Agent Carter, marking the first time a character introduced in an MCU television series appears in an MCU film.

Additionally, Hiroyuki Sanada portrays Akihiko, a Yakuza boss operating in Tokyo who opposes Barton. Lexi Rabe portrays Morgan Stark, Tony and Pepper's daughter. Katherine Langford was cast as an older Morgan, but her scene was cut from the final film. Emma Fuhrmann portrays an older Cassie Lang, Scott's daughter, after the character was played as a child by Abby Ryder Fortson in previous MCU films. Avengers co-creator Stan Lee has a posthumous cameo in the film, appearing digitally de-aged as a car driver in 1970; this was his final film appearance. Ken Jeong and Yvette Nicole Brown cameo as a storage facility guard and a S.H.I.E.L.D. employee, respectively. Co-director Joe Russo (credited as Gozie Agbo) has a cameo appearance as a grieving gay man, which is the first time an openly homosexual character has been portrayed in an MCU film. Joe's daughters Ava and Lia Russo portray Barton's daughter Lila and a fan of Hulk, respectively. Thanos creator Jim Starlin also appears as a grieving man. The character Howard the Duck appears in a non-speaking cameo.

Production 

In October 2014, Marvel announced a two-part sequel to Avengers: Age of Ultron (2015), titled Avengers: Infinity War. Part 1 was scheduled to be released on May 4, 2018, with Part 2 scheduled for May 3, 2019. In April 2015, Marvel announced that Anthony and Joe Russo would direct both parts of Avengers: Infinity War, with back-to-back filming expected to begin in 2016. That same month, Kevin Feige said the films were titled as two parts of a single film because of the shared elements between the films, but he felt they would be "two distinct" films, not one story split across two films. By May 2015, Christopher Markus and Stephen McFeely signed on to write the screenplays for both parts of the film. In May 2016, the Russos revealed that they would be retitling the two films, to further remove this misconception. That July, Marvel removed the film's title, simply referring to it as untitled Avengers film. Feige and the Russo brothers indicated the title was being withheld because it would give away plot details for this film and Infinity War.

Principal photography began on August 10, 2017, under the working title Mary Lou 2, at Pinewood Atlanta Studios in Fayette County, Georgia, with Trent Opaloch serving as director of photography. The film, along with Infinity War, were shot using ARRI Alexa IMAX 2D cameras, thus marking the first time that a Hollywood feature film was shot entirely with IMAX digital cameras. That same month, filming occurred in The Gulch area of Downtown Atlanta, near the Five Points MARTA station, and Piedmont Park. Feige explained that the films were originally scheduled to be filmed simultaneously but were ultimately shot back-to-back, as "It became too complicated to cross-board them like that, and we found ourselves—again, something would always pay the price. We wanted to be able to focus and shoot one movie and then focus and shoot another movie." Anthony Russo originally felt it made more sense to shoot the films simultaneously due to financial and logistical reasons considering the large number of cast members, and had suggested that "some days we'll be shooting the first movie and some days we'll be shooting the second movie. Just jumping back and forth." The 2013 Asgard scenes were shot at Durham Cathedral in Durham, England during production of Infinity War in early May 2017. Production wrapped on January 11, 2018, although additional filming took place in Dutchess and Ulster counties in New York in June 2018. Reshoots began by September 7, 2018, and concluded on October 12, 2018. More reshoots occurred in January 2019. Location shooting also took place in St Abbs, Scotland, which doubled for New Asgard in Norway. Evans and Hemsworth each earned $15million for the film.

The film's official title, Avengers: Endgame, and final U.S. release date of April 26, 2019, were revealed with the film's first trailer in December 2018. Visual effects for the film were created by Industrial Light & Magic, Weta Digital, DNEG, Framestore, Cinesite, Digital Domain, Rise, Lola VFX, Cantina Creative, Capital T, Technicolor VFX, and Territory Studio. As with previous MCU films, Lola worked on the de-aging sequences; the film features 200 de-aging and aging shots. Downey, Evans, Ruffalo, Hemsworth, Johansson, and Renner were de-aged to their 2012 appearances for scenes recreated from The Avengers (2012). Michael Douglas, John Slattery, and Stan Lee were also de-aged for the 1970 New Jersey sequence; Douglas's appearance in The Streets of San Francisco was referenced. Lola also aged-up Evans for the final scene where he is portrayed as an elderly man, using some make-up and a stand-in as reference. Jeffrey Ford and Matthew Schmidt served as the film's editors.

Music 

In June 2016, Alan Silvestri, who composed the score for The Avengers, was revealed to be returning to score both Infinity War and Endgame. The Russos started working with Silvestri on the Endgame score in early November 2018, and it was completed in late March 2019. A soundtrack album featuring Silvestri's score was released by Hollywood Records digitally on April 26, 2019, with a physical release on May 24. A video for the track "Portals", composed for the climactic scene in which reinforcements arrive for the Avengers, was released on June 13.

Silvestri described the score as having the most versatile tone of the franchise, ranging from "thunderous percussion and powerful brass" for the action sequences to minimalist, jazz-inspired music for Ant-Man and the Quantum Realm. Silvestri reprises his themes from the previous Avengers films and Captain America: The First Avenger, including material he wrote for Thanos and the Infinity Stones in Infinity War. He found writing the music to end Captain America's story poignant, since he had "been on this journey with him since the beginning". The film also uses the Ant-Man (2015) theme by Christophe Beck, the Doctor Strange (2016) theme by Michael Giacchino, and the Captain Marvel theme by Pinar Toprak. Additionally, the songs "Come and Get Your Love" by Redbone and "It's Been a Long, Long Time" by Jule Styne and Sammy Cahn are used, after previously being heard in Guardians of the Galaxy and Captain America: The Winter Soldier (2014), respectively.

Marketing 
The marketing campaign for Endgame cost over $200 million, the most for any Marvel Studios film. Promotional partners included Stand Up to Cancer, Mastercard, Ulta Beauty, the Audi e-tron GT concept car (which appears in the film), McDonald's, GEICO, Coca-Cola, Google, General Mills, Hertz, Ziploc, Oppo, and Synchrony Financial.

A year prior to the film's release, Germain Lussier of io9 spoke on the approach Marvel might have to take in marketing the film, given the end of Infinity War where many established characters die. He questioned if those characters would appear on posters and in toy campaigns and if the actors portraying them would participate in press events leading up to the film's release. Lussier felt Disney and Marvel could focus on the original Avengers team members, who make up the majority of the living characters, but noted it would be more beneficial to show the return of the dead characters, which would create a "mystery and curiosity about  they come back" and a "whole new level of interest" for the film "while having all the stars front and center". Feige spoke to this in June 2018, stating that these dead characters would not be featured in any marketing for the film. He presented a behind-the-scenes video from the film at CineEurope, and said that the official marketing campaign for the film would begin at the end of 2018. In early December 2018, ahead of the first trailer's release, Graeme McMillan of The Hollywood Reporter spoke to the "fevered anticipation" surrounding it and felt "remarkable", which was mostly "fan-created, without [the] noticeable direction from Marvel or the filmmakers involved" and that the amount of knowledge surrounding the film without any type of promotion was "a kind of brand awareness" that the most distributors want for. Because of this, McMillan urged Marvel not to release any trailers for the film since "the advanced level of enthusiasm [...] [was] likely to build" before the film's release. That said, he added that the eventual release of the trailer would take away the "Schrödinger's cat-esque position" as it was "almost guaranteed" to cause fans a disappointment at this point.

The first trailer for the film was released on December 7, 2018. Dustin Sandoval, vice president of digital marketing for Marvel Studios, stated the marketing team "made the choice" to prevent including the "title or hashtag" for the film of its trailer's posts, allowing fans to see the trailer without spoiling it by watching "at the end". Richard Newby, also of The Hollywood Reporter felt that, while not much new material had been revealed in the trailer, it offered a "somber glimpse of a universe made unrecognizable" and let the viewer consider "the ending of Avengers: Infinity War and our questions of loss". Newby also noted how the trailer highlighted the characters' "humble beginnings" with its visual language, and concluded it left viewers with "just as many questions as we had before". Austen Goslin of Polygon pointed out that the title not only references a line Doctor Strange tells Tony Stark in Infinity War, but also a line spoken by Stark in Age of Ultron. Goslin said, "The scene surrounding this line in Age of Ultron is one of the most important ones in the movie. Things look dark, and the group of heroes face an enemy they don't think they can defeat." As such, the Endgame trailer "mirrors this perfectly" and "shows us that the Avengers' two most prominent characters are who they've always been: Iron Man, a pessimist who keeps fighting no matter how hopeless things look, and Captain America, an optimist who believes that nothing is hopeless when the world's heroes fight together." The trailer was viewed 289 million times in its first 24 hours, becoming the most viewed trailer in that time period, surpassing the record of Avengers: Infinity War (230 million views). The trailer also set a record for Twitter conversation for a film trailer in the first 24 hours, generating 549,000 mentions. By January 3, 2019, BoxOffice "Trailer Impact" metric service indicated approximately 77–78% of people surveyed who viewed the Endgame trailer in the past three weeks had expressed interest in seeing the film. In the three weeks it was measured by the service, the trailer was number one for all and had the top two percent of respondents express interest in seeing the film since the service's introduction in March 2018.

The second trailer for the film, along with the theatrical release poster, was released on March 14, 2019. All 13 actors featured on the poster received top-billing except for Danai Gurira, whose name still appeared in the poster's bottom billing block along with Benedict Wong, Jon Favreau, and Gwyneth Paltrow (none of whom were featured on the poster). Despite this, her exclusion in the top billing prompted criticism from some fans. Petrana Radulovic of Polygon noted how an actor is credited on the poster "is a complex process" based on "dealing with agents, fees, and movie star demands." However, Marvel Studios released an updated poster later that day with Gurira in the top billing. The second trailer was viewed 268 million times in the first 24 hours, becoming the second most-viewed trailer in that time period behind the film's first trailer.

Release

Theatrical 
Avengers: Endgame had its world premiere at the Los Angeles Convention Center on April 22, 2019. Disney converted the convention center's Hall K for the film's premiere, working with Dolby and QSC Audio to install a  screen, Dolby Vision projectors, and a Dolby Atmos sound system. The convention center also held the premiere's red carpet arrival and after-party. The film was released in Australia, China, and other parts of Asia and Europe on April 24, in the United Kingdom on April 25, in the United States and India on April 26, and in Russia on April 29, in IMAX and 3D. It was originally scheduled to be released in the United States on May 3. Radio Liberty alleged that the Russian government postponed the film's release in that country to promote Russian-produced films. Avengers: Endgame is part of Phase Three of the MCU.

Following the release of the second trailer for Marvel Studios' Spider-Man: Far From Home (2019) on May 6, Marvel began showing it at the end of Endgame screenings with a message before the film from Far From Home star Tom Holland telling the audience to stay until the end of the credits to see the trailer. In June, Feige announced that Avengers: Endgame would be re-released in theaters with seven minutes of new post-credits footage, including a Stan Lee tribute, an unfinished deleted scene, and the opening scene of Far From Home. A limited edition poster would also be given out at select theaters. The re-release began on June 28 in the United States, across 1,040 theaters.

Home media 
Avengers: Endgame was released in the US on digital download by Walt Disney Studios Home Entertainment on July 30, and on Ultra HD Blu-ray, Blu-ray, and DVD on August 13. The film was released on both Digital HD and Blu-ray on September 2 in the UK. Streaming is exclusive to Disney+ since November 12. The digital and Blu-ray releases include behind-the-scenes featurettes, audio commentary, deleted scenes, and a blooper reel. Despite being filmed with IMAX cameras and released in IMAX theaters in the 1.90:1 aspect ratio, the home media release only includes the cropped 2.39:1 aspect ratio version that was used for non-IMAX screenings. The IMAX Enhanced version of the film was made available on Disney+ beginning on November 12, 2021. The film generated  from DVD and Blu-ray sales in the US.

Reception

Box office 

Adjusted for inflation, Gone with the Wind (1939) remains the highest-grossing film, and Avengers: Endgame is the fifth-highest-grossing film of all time worldwide.

The film had a worldwide opening of $1.2billion, the biggest of all time and nearly double Infinity War previous record of $640million. It is also the fastest film ever to eclipse the $1billion and $1.5billion mark, doing so in just five days and eight days, respectively. Deadline Hollywood estimated the film would break even just five days after its release, which is "unheard of for a major studio tentpole during its opening weekend". The website eventually calculated the film's final net profit as $890million, accounting for production budgets, marketing, talent participations, and other costs; box office grosses and home media revenues placed it first on their list of 2019's "Most Valuable Blockbusters".

On May 4, the film's earnings at the global box office passed the entire theatrical run of Infinity War and became the fastest film ever to gross $2billion worldwide, amassing the amount in only 11 days (beating Avatar, which did so in 47 days). It also became the fifth film to surpass this threshold (after Avatar, Titanic (1997), Star Wars: The Force Awakens (2015), and Infinity War), and the second film to surpass the threshold of $2.5billion, doing so in just 20 days, outpacing Avatar record of 72 days.

Pre-sale records 
In late December 2018, Endgame was listed as one of the most anticipated films of 2019, ranking second by IMDb, and first by Fandango and Atom Tickets.

Due to the high demand when pre-sale tickets became available in the U.S. on April 2, 2019, customers on both Atom Tickets and Fandango experienced long wait times and system delays, while AMC Theatres' website and app crashed completely for several hours. That same day, Fandango announced the film became its top-selling pre-sale title for the first 24 hours, topping Star Wars: The Force Awakens previous record in just six hours. Atom said the film was also the website's bestselling first-day film (outselling Aquaman (2018) by four times), and Regal Cinemas reported that Endgame had sold more tickets in its first eight hours than Infinity War did in its entire first week. The film grossed $120–140million in pre-sales alone. The day prior to the film's release, Fandango announced it was its biggest pre-selling title of all time, beating The Force Awakens, with over 8,000 sold-out showtimes across the country.

In India, the film sold one million tickets in just one day for the English, Hindi, Tamil, and Telugu language screenings; 18 tickets were sold every second. In China, pre-sale tickets became available on April 12 and sold a record one million tickets in just six hours, outselling Infinity War first 24-hour total within the first hour, and made $114.5million (RMB 770 million) just from pre-sales.

United States and Canada 

On April 4, industry tracking projected the film would gross $200–250million domestically during its opening weekend, although some insiders saw those figures as conservative and expected a $260–300million debut. By the week of its release, domestic estimates had risen to $260–270million, with some insiders still suggesting a $300million debut was possible. The film played in 4,662 theaters, 410 of which were in IMAX; it was the widest release ever, surpassing the record of Despicable Me 3 (2017) 4,529 theaters. Avengers: Endgame earned $357.1million in its opening weekend, breaking Infinity War record by nearly $100million. It also set records for Friday ($157.5million, including $60million from Thursday night previews), Saturday ($109.3million), and Sunday ($90.4million) totals, as well as was more of a total gross alone than the previous box office high of all films combined ($314million). The film then made $36.9million on Monday and $33.1million on Tuesday, both the third-highest of all time. In its second weekend the film made $147.4million (the second-best sophomore frame ever) for a 10-day total of $621.3million. It was the fastest film to ever pass the $600million milestone, beating The Force Awakens 12 days and less than half the 26 days it took Infinity War. The following week, the film grossed $64.8million, the fourth-best third weekend ever. It also passed the $700million mark, tying The Force Awakens record of 16 days. Endgame was finally dethroned in its fourth weekend by newcomer John Wick: Chapter 3 – Parabellum (2019). It made $17.2million the following weekend (and a total of $22.3million over the four-day Memorial Day frame), crossing the $800million threshold domestically. During the re-release, which occurred over its tenth weekend, the film was added to 1,040 theaters and made $6.1million, an increase of 207% from the previous weekend. In its thirteenth weekend the film made $1.2million, which put it over the threshold to top Avatar all-time record.

Other territories 
Internationally, Endgame was projected to gross around $680million over its first five days for a global debut of $850–950million. The film was initially projected to gross $250–280million in China in its opening weekend, but made a record $107.5million (RMB 719 million) in the country on its first day, including $28.2million (RMB 189million) from midnight, 3 AM and 6 AM screenings, beating The Fate of the Furious (2017) previous record of $9.1million. Due to the record-breaking first day, partnered with word of mouth (with a 9.1 on local review aggregator Douban and a 9.3 on ticket website Maoyan), debut projections were increased to over $300million. Overall, the film made $169million on the first day from international countries, the highest total of all time. Its largest markets after China were India ($9million), South Korea ($8.4million; the largest non-holiday single day gross ever), Australia ($7.1million), France ($6million), and Italy ($5.8million). Like domestically, the film ended up over-performing and debuted to $866million overseas. Its largest markets, every one of which set the record for best-ever opening in the country, were China ($330.5million; RMB 2.22billion), the United Kingdom ($53.8million), South Korea ($47.4million), Mexico ($33.1million), Australia ($30.8million), Brazil ($26million), Spain ($13.3million), Japan ($13million), and Vietnam ($10million). It also made $21.6million over its first four days in Russia after a delay of its premiere that was caused by the Russian government.

In its first week, the film's top five largest international markets were China, the United Kingdom, South Korea, Mexico, and India. A week after its release, it became the highest-grossing foreign film of all time in China and India. In its second weekend the film's running total passed $1.569billion from international markets, passing Titanic as the second-highest film overseas of all time.

, the film's top international markets were China ($632million), United Kingdom ($115million), South Korea ($105million), Brazil ($86million), and Mexico ($78million).

Critical response 

The website's critical consensus reads, "Exciting, entertaining, and emotionally impactful, Avengers: Endgame does whatever it takes to deliver a satisfying finale to Marvel's epic Infinity Saga." Metacritic, which uses a weighted average, assigned the film a score of 78 out of 100 based on 57 critics, indicating "generally favorable reviews". Audiences polled by CinemaScore gave the film a rare "A+" grade on an A+ to F scale, the third Marvel film to earn the score after The Avengers and Black Panther (2018), and those at PostTrak gave the film 5 out of 5 stars and an 85% "definite recommend".

Writing for NPR, Glen Weldon gave the film a positive review and found the film to be a worthy sequel to its predecessor, stating, "The Russos' decision to stick close to the experiences of the remaining Avengers proves a rewarding one, as they've expressly constructed the film as an extended victory lap for the Marvel Cinematic Universe writ large. Got a favorite character from any Marvel movie over the past decade, no matter how obscure? Prepare to get serviced, fan." Peter Travers in his review for Rolling Stone gave the film 4 out of 5 stars, saying, "You don't have to make jokes about the clichéd time travel plot – the film is ready, willing and able to make its own, with Back to the Future coming in for a serious ribbing."

Peter Debruge of Variety wrote, "After the must-see showdown that was Infinity War, the Russo brothers deliver a more fan-facing three-hour follow-up, rewarding loyalty to Marvel Cinematic Universe." J. R. Kinnard of PopMatters wrote, "Big budget action filmmaking doesn't get much better than this." Todd McCarthy of The Hollywood Reporter said, "[W]hat comes across most strongly here, oddly enough for an effects-driven comic-book-derived film, is the character acting, especially from Downey, Ruffalo, Evans, Hemsworth, Brolin, and Paul Rudd". Richard Roeper, writing for the Chicago Sun-Times, gave the film four stars and praised its "emotional punch", as well as the "funny, well-paced, smart, expertly rendered screenplay by Christopher Markus and Stephen McFeely, crisp direction from Anthony Russo and Joe Russo, [...] and the universally stellar performances".

The New York Times reviewer A. O. Scott gave the film a positive though guarded review, stating, "Endgame is a monument to adequacy, a fitting capstone to an enterprise that figured out how to be good enough for enough people enough of the time. Not that it's really over, of course: Disney and Marvel are still working out new wrinkles in the time-money continuum. But the Russos do provide the sense of an ending, a chance to appreciate what has been done before the timelines reset and we all get back to work." Justin Chang of the Los Angeles Times wrote that "Avengers: Endgame achieves and earns its climactic surge of feeling, even as it falls just short of real catharsis". Some have noted the film as a notable improvement over its predecessor, Avengers: Infinity War, such as Brian Tallerico of RogerEbert.com, who stated that Endgame is "a more patient, focused film [than Infinity War], even as its plot draws in elements of a dozen other movies." Matt Zoller Seitz, also of RogerEbert.com, gave the film a positive assessment as compared with Infinity War, which he considered "too crowded, too rushed and yet too long". Seitz stated that Endgame is "a heartfelt and satisfying experience", along with being a "surprisingly relaxed, character-driven, self-aware yet sincere comedy [for] two-thirds of [the film]. Much of the script suggests a laid-back Richard Linklater movie with superheroes". Joe Morgenstern of The Wall Street Journal acknowledged the unique achievement that Avengers: Endgame accomplished as the conclusion of the Infinity Saga, calling the final battle "inevitably unwieldy [...] but thrilling all the same, and followed by a delicate coda. So many stories. So many adventures. So much to sort out before the next cycle starts."

Richard Brody, writing for The New Yorker, was more critical of the film, opining that the good acting was not matched by comparable skill from the directors. He said, "The Russos have peculiarly little sense of visual pleasure, little sense of beauty, little sense of metaphor, little aptitude for texture or composition; their spectacular conceit is purely one of scale, which is why their finest moments are quiet and dramatic ones". Anthony Lane of The New Yorker gave the film a compromising review, finding it to be overdeveloped and overwrought, stating, "The one thing you do need to know about Avengers: Endgame is that it runs for a little over three hours, and that you can easily duck out during the middle hour, do some shopping, and slip back into your seat for the climax. You won't have missed a thing."

Accolades 

At the 92nd Academy Awards, Avengers: Endgame received a nomination for Best Visual Effects. The film's other nominations include an Annie Award (which it won), a British Academy Film Award, and three Critics' Choice Movie Awards (winning two). It was the most-viewed Wikipedia article of 2019, garnering 44.2 million page views. In February 2022, the Avengers assembling moment was named one of the five finalists for Oscars Cheer Moment as part of the "Oscars Fan Favorite" contest for the 94th Academy Awards, despite the film not being eligible for other Academy Awards that year.

Future 

In May 2018, Disney CEO Bob Iger said of Marvel's plans beyond Endgame, "I'm guessing we will try our hand at what I'll call a new franchise beyond Avengers, but that doesn't necessarily mean you won't see more Avengers down the road. We just haven't made any announcements about that." Iger added, "Given the popularity of the characters and given the popularity of the franchise, I don't think people should conclude there will never be another Avengers movie." Shortly after the film's premiere, the Russo brothers said they were not opposed to returning to the MCU in the future due to their positive relationship with Marvel Studios, but did not plan to do so at that time. In January 2021, Marvel Studios President Kevin Feige said another Avengers film would happen "at some point".

At San Diego Comic-Con in July 2022, Feige announced Avengers: The Kang Dynasty and Avengers: Secret Wars, scheduled to be released on May 2, 2025, and November 7, 2025, respectively. The two films will serve as the conclusion to Phase Six of the MCU. Feige later stated that the Russo brothers would not be returning to direct the films. Shortly after, Destin Daniel Cretton, who directed Shang-Chi and the Legend of the Ten Rings (2021), was confirmed as director of The Kang Dynasty. In September, Ant-Man and the Wasp: Quantumania (2023) writer Jeff Loveness was revealed to be writing the screenplay. The next month, Loki season one (2021) head writer and Doctor Strange in the Multiverse of Madness (2022) writer Michael Waldron was hired to write the screenplay for Avengers: Secret Wars. Shortly after, Secret Warss release date was pushed back to May 1, 2026.

Notes

References

External links 

 
 
 
 
 Script 

2010s American films
2010s English-language films
2010s superhero films
2019 3D films
2019 science fiction action films
4DX films
Alien invasions in films
Alternate timeline films
American 3D films
American crossover films
American post-apocalyptic films
American science fiction action films
American sequel films
Asgard in fiction
Avengers (film series)
Fiction about intergalactic travel
Films about extraterrestrial life
Films about quantum mechanics
Films about size change
Films about time travel
Films directed by Anthony and Joe Russo
Films scored by Alan Silvestri
Films set in 1970
Films set in 2012
Films set in 2013
Films set in 2014
Films set in 2018
Films set in 2023
Films set in a fictional country
Films set in Africa
Films set in New Jersey
Films set in New York (state)
Films set in New York City
Films set in Norway
Films set in palaces
Films set in San Francisco
Films set in the 1940s
Films set in Tokyo
Films set on fictional planets
Films shot at Pinewood Atlanta Studios
Films shot in Atlanta
Films shot in County Durham
Films shot in New York (state)
Films shot in Scotland
Films using motion capture
Films with screenplays by Christopher Markus and Stephen McFeely
IMAX films
Marvel Cinematic Universe: Phase Three films
Nanotechnology in fiction
Superhero crossover films